President Adams or Adams administration may refer to:
 John Adams (1735–1826), 2nd president of the United States
 Presidency of John Adams, his presidency
 John Quincy Adams (1767–1848), 6th president of the United States and son of the 2nd president
 Presidency of John Quincy Adams, his presidency

Other uses
 , named for the 2nd president
 , named for both the 2nd and 6th presidents

See also
 Adams (disambiguation)
 Adams political family
 "The Adams Administration", a 2015 song from the musical Hamilton